Each year TVB drama series and artists are honored at different award shows over Asia. The yearly list of winners of the main TVB Awards shows are hereby listed together by category. The TVB Awards shows are TVB Anniversary Awards, TVB Awards in Malaysia and StarHub TVB Awards in Singapore. In exception, winners in Asian Television Awards are included too. At this moment, the lists are only drawn up for Best / My Most Favourite Drama, Best / My Most Favourite Actor and Actress, Best / My Most Favourite Supporting Actor and Actress and My Most Favourite (Male / Female) TV Character(s).

Included Awards Shows 

Awards shows exclusively for TVB dramas and artists: 
Depending on the year and the category, the winners are voted by a professional panel and/or by the audience.
 The TVB Anniversary Awards in Hong Kong is the most important TVB awards show. The first award ceremony took place on November 19, 1997. Since 2009, the show is annually held in December.
 The TVB Star Awards Malaysia was established in 2004. Over the years it has been renamed multiple times: Astro Wah Lai Toi Drama Awards (2004-2009), My Astro On Demand Favourite Awards (2010-2012) and TVB Star Awards Malaysia (2013- ). The annually ceremony takes place around end-November, prior to the TVB Anniversary Awards in Hong Kong.
 The StarHub TVB Awards in Singapore started in 2010. This ceremony takes place much earlier than the two other TVB Awards shows, which means that the annual nomination list includes dramas that aired the year before. The nomination for My Most Favourite Actor and My Most Favourite Actress were based on multiple performances in TVB dramas. Starting from 2014, artists are nominated for one specific role.

Asia awards shows 
 Asian Television Awards (ATA) is an awards ceremony that recognizes excellence in programming, production and performance in the Asian TV industry. Each year, nominees for each category are carefully selected for their most outstanding performances. Over a more than 30 categories, the winners are determined by an expert panel of over 60 judges form across the region. The ceremony takes place in December. * Over the years, different Hong Kong dramas and artists have been nominated and some of them were awarded for their performances. TVB Artists that once won at ATA: Raymond Lam, Bowie Lam, Kevin Cheng and Moses Chan for Best Actor. Michelle Yim and Charmaine Sheh for Best Actress. Mak Cheung Ching for Best Supporting Actor. Susan Tse, Fala Chen and Nancy Wu for Best Supporting Actress. In 2012, The Confidant won Best Drama. Only the winners of Hong Kong are included in the lists.

Winners Lists

Best / Favourite Drama

Best / Favourite Leading Actor

Multiple wins Best / Favourite Actor:

Best / Favourite Leading Actress

Multiple wins Best / Favourite Actress:

Best / Favourite Supporting Actor

Multiple wins Best / Supporting Actor:

Best / Favourite Supporting Actress

Multiple wins Best / Favourite Supporting Actress:

My Favourite TV Character

Multiple wins My Favourite TV Character:

Record Holders

TVB Anniversary Awards (HK)
Full list of record holders at TVB Anniversary Awards

(*) winning both Best Actor/Actress and My Favourite Male/Female Character at the same time

Malaysia TVB Star Awards (MY)

Singapore StarHub TVB Awards (SG)

Asian Television Awards (ATA)

Most wins for Drama/Acting in Lead & Supporting Roles

Grand Slam refers to winning at all 3 Awards shows exclusively for TVB dramas and artists:
 TVB Anniversary Awards
 TVB Star Awards Malaysia
 StarHub TVB Awards

Best Drama 
 War and Beauty won 9 awards in 2004 - making it the most winning TVB drama.
 Since 2006, 4 TVB dramas - Heart of Greed (2007), Moonlight Resonance (2008), Rosy Business (2009) and A Fist Within Four Walls (2016) hold the record for the most wins by a drama series with 6 awards each.
 Moonlight Resonance, Triumph in the Skies 2 and A Fist Within Four Walls are the 3 dramas to win the grand slam for Best/Favorite Drama. All 3 dramas have won the TVB Anniversary Awards, TVB Star Awards Malaysia and StarHub TVB Awards.

Best Actor / My Favourite Leading Actor 
 Kevin Cheng and Ruco Chan have both won the Best Actor grand slam. Cheng won for Ghetto Justice in 2011 (he also won My Favorite Male Character at the Asian Television Awards, winning in total 4 awards for one role) and Chan won for A Fist Within Four Walls in 2016. 
 Roger Kwok holds the record for winning Best Actor at both TVB Anniversary Awards and TVB Star Awards Malaysia for the same role 3 times - for Square Pegs in 2003, Life Made Simple in 2005 and Black Heart White Soul in 2014.
 Gallen Lo, Roger Kwok and Wayne Lai hold the record for the most Best Actor wins at TVB Anniversary Awards. They have each won the Best Actor award 3 times.
 Roger Kwok, Moses Chan and Ruco Chan hold the record for most Best Actor wins in all four award shows - they have each won 6 awards.

Best Actress / My Favourite Leading Actress

 Tavia Yeung, Charmaine Sheh and Nancy Wu have all won the Best Actress grand slam. Yeung won for Silver Spoon, Sterling Shackles in 2012, Sheh won for Line Walker in 2014 and Wu won for A Fist Within Four Walls in 2016.
 Charmaine Sheh holds the record for winning Best Actress for the same role at 3 different award shows twice - for Line Walker and Can't Buy Me Love.
 Liza Wang, Sheren Tang, Charmaine Sheh and Nancy Wu hold the record for the most Best Actress wins at TVB Anniversary Awards. They have each won the Best Actress award 2 times.
 Charmaine Sheh holds the record for the most Best Actress wins in all four award shows - she has won 10 awards in total.

Best Supporting Actor

 Him Law holds the record for the most Best Supporting Actor wins in all four awards shows - he has won 3 awards in total.

Best Supporting Actress

 Fala Chen and Nancy Wu hold the joint record for winning Best Supporting Actress for the same role at 3 different award shows. Chen won for No Regrets in 2010 and Wu won for Gloves Come Off in 2012. Both of them also won the Best Supporting Actress at the Asian Television Awards for their respective roles. (Note - there was no StarHub TVB Awards for Best Supporting Actress category until 2014.)
 Fala Chen, Nancy Wu and Sharon Chan hold the record for most Best Supporting Actress wins in all four awards shows - they have each won 4 awards.

Top winners - Total
(TVB Anniversary Awards, Malaysia TVB Star Awards, StarHub TVB Awards Singapore, Asian Television Awards)

References
 

TVB original programming
TVB Anniversary Awards
Hong Kong television-related lists